Temptation of Wife is a 2012 Philippine television drama revenge series broadcast by GMA Network. The series is based on a 2008 South Korean drama series of the same title. It premiered on the network's Telebabad line up from October 29, 2012 to April 5, 2013, replacing Luna Blanca.

Mega Manila ratings are provided by AGB Nielsen Philippines.

Series overview

Episodes

October 2012

November 2012

December 2012

January 2013

February 2013

March 2013

April 2013

References

Lists of Philippine drama television series episodes